Alburnoides holciki is a species of small (10.2 cm max length) freshwater fish in the family Cyprinidae. It was endemic to the Hari River drainage in northwestern Afghanistan, northeastern Iran, and southern Turkmenistan. Recent studies have shown that this species is also found in the Amu Darya basin in Tajikistan and Uzbekistan.

References 

Alburnoides
Fish described in 2012
Fish of Iran